Maracayia is a genus of moths of the family Crambidae. The genus was first described by Hans Georg Amsel in 1956.

Species
Maracayia chlorisalis (Walker, 1859)
Maracayia percludalis (Möschler, 1881)

References

Spilomelinae
Taxa named by Hans Georg Amsel
Crambidae genera